Samuel Thruston Ballard (February 11, 1855 – January 18, 1926) was an American politician, philanthropist, and miller, who served as the 33rd Lieutenant Governor of Kentucky from 1919 to 1923, under Governor Edwin P. Morrow.

Samuel Thruston Ballard was the son of Andrew Jackson Ballard and Fannie Thruston Ballard.

Ballard was educated in public schools of Louisville and worked to expand his education at Huntoon's private academy. Cornell became his alma mater and graduated there with a degree of Bachelor of Science in 1878 at the age of 23.

For the next four years Ballard would work for Chess, Carley & Company.

In 1880, with his brother R. C. Ballard Thruston, Ballard was president of the Ballard & Ballard Flour Company. A James Jones helped to start the firm. The first mill was built in the back yard of the Ballard estate on Walnut Street.

On January 25, Ballard was married to Sunshine Harris (1861-1938), the daughter of Theodore Harris of Louisville Kentucky.

In 1884 faced a debt crisis due to hard times in the land.

In 1889, Ballard & Ballard Co. was one of the first employers to introduce the profit sharing plan.

Ballard attended the 1904 World's Fair in St. Louis, Missouri. While they're Ballard purchased and donated the Egyptian mummy Tchaenhotep, for the Louisville Free Public Library Museum.

In 1913, President Woodrow Wilson appointed Mr. Ballard a member of the Commission on Industrial Relations.

Samuel and Sunshine had one daughter and three grandchildren. Thruston Ballard Morton, Janes Lewis Morton and Rogers Clark Ballard Morton.

In 1925, Ballard became ill at his winter home at Eau Gallie Fla. On January 18, 1926, after being bedridden for weeks, Samuel died in his home at Glenview at the age of 71. The disease that took his life was cancerous in nature. He was interred at Cave Hill Cemetery.

External links

1855 births
1926 deaths
Politicians from Louisville, Kentucky
Businesspeople from Kentucky
Kentucky Republicans
Lieutenant Governors of Kentucky